Index fossils (also known as guide fossils or indicator fossils) are fossils used to define and identify geologic periods (or faunal stages). Index fossils must have a short vertical range, wide geographic distribution and rapid evolutionary trends. Another term, Zone fossil is used when the fossil have all the characters stated above except wide geographical distribution, they are limited to a zone and can't be used for correlations of strata.

See also
Biostratigraphy#Index fossils

References

 

he:מאובן#מאובן מנחה